, lit.  'doctor of the things of nature'), abbreviated Dr. rer. nat., is a doctoral academic degree awarded by universities in some European countries (e.g. Germany, Austria and Czech Republic) to graduates in mathematics, physics, chemistry, biology, geology,
computer science, pharmacy, psychology, other natural sciences and similar areas. Universities might also award different titles for these fields, depending on the topic of a PhD thesis and which titles a university can award. In German-speaking Switzerland the equivalent of Dr. rer. nat. is Dr. phil. nat. The Karlsruhe Institute of Technology for example might award a Dr. rer. nat. or a Dr.-Ing for computer science graduates, differentiating between degrees in theoretical and practical topics.
These doctoral degrees are equivalent to the PhD awarded in English-speaking countries. German universities often translate a Dr. rer. nat. to doctorate of natural sciences or Doctor of Science.

To start a PhD in Germany, students must typically possess a master's degree in the related field. PhD programs in the natural sciences are often designed to allow graduation in three to five years, with an average graduation time of 4.3 years. The exact requirements for graduation differ by university but usually include the requirement of a substantial contribution to the field of study.

In the Czech Republic and Slovakia (formerly Czechoslovakia), a similarly designated degree, abbreviated RNDr., is awarded. It should not be confused with Dr. rer. nat., as the former is nowadays an extension of a master-like degree, but it used to be equivalent to PhD.

See also
 Doctorate#Germany
 Academic degree#Czech Republic
 Doctor of Philosophy

References

Doctoral degrees
Science education